Charles Victor Thompson (born 13 June 1970) is an inmate sentenced to death in April 1999 and currently resides on Texas Death Row. He was sentenced to death for the murder of his girlfriend Dennise Hayslip, and her other boyfriend, Darren Cain, on 30 April 1998. Thompson made headlines in 2005 by escaping from Harris County Jail in Houston, Texas, after a re-sentencing hearing where he was sentenced to death for a second time, using a forged ID badge, claiming to be with the Attorney General's office. He was captured four days later outside a liquor store in Shreveport, Louisiana where he was using a pay phone while intoxicated. He was able to get food and clothing, he told investigators, posing as a Hurricane Katrina evacuee. He also got money from Good Samaritans in Shreveport.

Thompson is appealing his death penalty conviction as he states that there was insufficient evidence to support his capital murder conviction because intervening medical care was the direct cause of Dennise Hayslip’s death, not the actual shooting.

In 2008, a biography by Roger Rodriguez was released titled The Grass Beneath His Feet: The Charles Victor Thompson Story. In it, Rodriguez highlights the details regarding his escape, but he does not reveal how Thompson received a handcuff key.

Thompson resides in solitary confinement on Death Row in Livingston, Texas at the Polunsky Unit. He writes on inmate blog Between the Bars.

Thompson is featured in the fifth episode of the first season of the Netflix series I Am a Killer.

Thompson was also featured in an episode of "Extreme Prison Breaks", entitled "Runaway Chuck", which first aired on the Documentary Channel on 15 August 2012.

References

External links 
 Texas Department of Criminal Justice: Charles Victor Thompson
 CNN report on his escape and re-capture
 Thompson's victims memorial page as well as trial information
 Faces of Death Row: The Texas Tribune

1970 births
1998 murders in the United States
American people convicted of murder
American prisoners sentenced to death
American escapees
Prisoners sentenced to death by Texas
Escapees from Texas detention
Living people
People convicted of murder by Texas